Meta is a department of Colombia. It is close to the geographic center of the country, to the east of the Andean mountains. A large portion of the department, which is also crossed by the Meta River, is covered by a grassland plain known as the Llanos. Its capital is Villavicencio. The department has a monument placed in the very geographic centre of Colombia, at a place known as Alto de Menegua, a few kilometers from Puerto López.

Achagua, which is similar to Piapoco, is an Indigenous language spoken by a minority in the department.

Municipalities

See also 
 Juan Manuel González Torres
 San Martín Territory

References

External links
 Folklore llanero
 Government Meta
Territorial-Environmental Information System of Colombian Amazon SIAT-AC website

 
States and territories established in 1960
Departments of Colombia